Jeffrey J. Bütz is an American writer on religion.

Bütz is an ordained Lutheran minister and adjunct professor of world religions at Pennsylvania State University.

Bütz' most recent book, The Secret Legacy of Jesus (2010), offers the thesis that the Judaic teachings of Jesus were passed in underground fashion from groups such as the Nazarenes and Ebionites to the Founding Fathers of the United States of America, via the Cathars and Freemasons.

Bütz' previous book, The Brother of Jesus and the Lost Teachings of Christianity, (2005) explores James the brother of Jesus (James the Just) and is, according to a reviewer, similar in content to Robert Eisenman's  James the Brother of Jesus: The Key to Unlocking the Secrets of early Christianity and the Dead Sea Scrolls.

Bütz' work follows in the line of Hugh Schonfield, Hyam Maccoby, Robert Eisenman, and James Tabor. Bütz writes "It is my personal conviction that maligned scholars such as Schonfield, Maccoby, Eisenman, and Tabor will one day be vindicated as prophets."

Works
 The Brother of Jesus and the Lost Teachings of Christianity, 2005, 
 The Secret Legacy of Jesus: The Judaic Teachings That Passed from James the Just to the Founding Fathers, 2010,

References

External links
The Brother of Jesus Butz's website.

Living people
American male writers
Year of birth missing (living people)